Red Dawn Foster is an American politician serving as a member of the South Dakota Senate from the 27th district, which encompasses the Pine Ridge Reservation as well as Bennett, Haakon, Jackson, Pennington and Oglala Lakota counties. Elected in November 2018, she assumed office on January 8, 2019 and is the current incumbent.

Early life and education

Red Dawn Foster graduated with a Bachelor of Arts in political science from the University of Colorado Denver and a Master of Business Administration from the University of Notre Dame. She is a member of the Oglala Sioux and Navajo tribes.

Political career

South Dakota State Legislature

Elections

In 2016, Foster ran alongside state Senator Jim Bradford for a seat in the South Dakota House of Representatives from the 27th district. However, in the general election she and Bradford lost to Republican nominees Liz May and Steve Livermont.

In the 2018 Democratic Primary, Red Dawn Foster ran against James Bradford and won 55.6% of the vote. In the general election, Foster ran against Republican Bill Hines and won 58.6% of votes.

In 2020, she ran against Republican Judd Schomp in the general election, winning 56.3% of votes.

In 2022, Foster ran as incumbent and beat Republican David Jones in the general election with 51.45% of votes.

According to South Dakota state legislative term limits, Foster can serve one more term in the Senate and is eligible to run for re-election in 2024.

Tenure
From 2019 to 2020, Foster served on the Agriculture and Natural Resoures, Health and Human Services, Military and Veterans Affairs, and Transportation committees. In the 2021-2022 legislative session, Foster served on the Commerce and Energy, Health and Human Services, and Local Government committees. In 2022, Foster also served on the Ag. Land Assessment Task Force, Rules Review, State-Tribal Relations and Study on Juvenile Justice interim committees.

Sponsored Bills and Political Positions (2022 Session)

Native American Rights 
Foster has spent her career advocating for the rights of Native American people in South Dakota and has sponsored a number of bills aimed at recognizing the achievements of Indigenous people as well as bills aimed at providing Native Americans the right to hunt, fish, and visit state parks free of licenses and fees. A controversial topic in South Dakota, Foster advocates for the inclusion of Native American History in South Dakota curriculum.

Missing or Murdered Indigenous Persons 
Senator Foster has introduced and sponsored a number of bills dedicated to drawing attention to the Missing or Murdered Indigenous Persons movement, which focuses on the high rates of unsolved murders and disappearances of Native Americans, specifically Indigenous women and girls, who are far more likely than other demographics to be victims of violence in their lifetimes.

Medicaid Expansion 
The expansion of Medicaid and Medicare programs are a heavily discussed topic in many states, and Foster is a strong advocate for the expansion of these programs in South Dakota.

Covid-19 Controversy 
When the Covid-19 virus spread to South Dakota in 2020, the Cheyenne River Sioux and Ogalala Sioux tribes instituted checkpoints on highways leading through reservation land in an attempt to limit the spread of the virus. During this time, the Navajo nation had been suffering high rates of infection and death due to the virus after reaching out to the United States Government and receiving little help. South Dakota's Governor Kristi Noem, who refused to implement any measures to combat Covid-19 and prioritized keeping the state open to benefit the economy, threatened to take legal action against the tribes, accusing them of breaking the law. The tribes combatted the threats with arguments that the checkpoints were legally instituted because the tribes are sovereign nations. Senator Red Dawn Foster stood with the tribes in criticizing the governor's lack of action and threats against tribes, stating that the Coronavirus was "a matter of life and death on a reservation.".

References

Democratic Party South Dakota state senators
Women state legislators in South Dakota
University of Colorado Denver alumni
Mendoza College of Business alumni
Living people
People from Pine Ridge, South Dakota
Oglala people
Year of birth missing (living people)
Native American women in politics
21st-century American politicians
21st-century American women politicians
21st-century Native American women
21st-century Native Americans